Dewhurst can refer to:

People
 Christopher John ("Jack") Dewhurst (1920–2006), British gynecologist
 Colleen Dewhurst (1924–1991), Canadian-born actress
 David Dewhurst (born 1945), American politician
 Dorothy Dewhurst (1886–1959), English stage and film actress
 Edward Dewhurst (1870–1941), Australian tennis player
 Fred Dewhurst (1863–1895), Preston North End and England international footballer
 Frederick Arthur Dewhurst (1911–1985), Canadian politician
 George Dewhurst (disambiguation)
 George Dewhurst (director), British actor, screenwriter and film director
 George Dewhurst (cricketer), Trinidadian cricketer
 Gerard Dewhurst (1872–1956), English cotton merchant, banker and amateur footballer.
 Ian Dewhurst (born 1990), Australian hurdler
 Jack Dewhurst (1876–1924), English footballer with Blackburn Rovers and Bury
 Keith Dewhurst (born 1931), English playwright and film and television scriptwriter
 Richard Dewhurst (1826–1895), American politician, member of the Wisconsin State Assembly
 Rob Dewhurst (born 1971), English football defender
 Robert Dewhurst (1851–1924), English cricketer
 Wynford Dewhurst (1864–1941), British artist and writer

Places
 Dewhurst, Clark County, Wisconsin
 Dewhurst, Victoria Australia

Other uses
 Dewhurst Stakes, flat race ran at Newmarket in England for juveniles over 7 furlongs.
 Corporal Oliver Dewhurst (alias Foggy), a character in Last of the Summer Wine